Shedd Aquarium (formally the John G. Shedd Aquarium) is an indoor public aquarium in Chicago, Illinois, in the United States.  Opened on May 30, 1930, the  aquarium was for some time the largest indoor facility in the world. Today it holds about 32,000 animals.

Shedd Aquarium was the first inland aquarium with a permanent saltwater fish collection. It is located on Lake Michigan, on the Museum Campus Chicago, along with the Adler Planetarium and the Field Museum of Natural History.

In 2015, the aquarium had 2.02 million visitors. It was the most visited aquarium in the U.S. in 2005, and in 2007, it surpassed the Field Museum as the most popular cultural attraction in Chicago. The aquarium contains 1,500 species, including fish, marine mammals, birds, snakes, amphibians, and insects.  The aquarium received awards for "best exhibit" from the Association of Zoos and Aquariums (AZA) for Seahorse Symphony in 1999, Amazon Rising in 2001, and Wild Reef in 2004.  It was designated a National Historic Landmark in 1987.

History

Shedd Aquarium was the gift of retail leader John G. Shedd, a protégé of Marshall Field (benefactor of the adjacent Field Museum), to the city of Chicago. Although Shedd only lived long enough to see the architect's first drawings for the aquarium, his widow, Mary R. Shedd, cut the ribbon at the official opening ceremony.

The aquarium cost $3 million to build, and initially included 132 exhibit tanks. Groundbreaking took place on November 2, 1927, and construction was completed on December 19, 1929; the first exhibits opened on May 30, 1930. As one of the first inland aquariums in the world, the Shedd had to rely on a custom-made railroad car, the Nautilus, for the transport of fish and seawater. The Nautilus lasted until 1959.

In 1930, 20 railroad tank cars made eight round trips between Key West and Chicago to transport  of seawater for the Shedd's saltwater exhibits. In 1933, Chicago hosted its second world's fair, the Century of Progress. The Aquarium was located immediately north of the fairgrounds, and the museum gained exposure to a large international crowd.

In 1971, Shedd Aquarium added one of its most popular exhibits, a  exhibit reproducing a Caribbean coral reef. That same year, the aquarium acquired its first research vessel, a 75-foot (23 m) boat for exploring the Caribbean, manned by a crew to conduct field research and collect specimens. In 1985, this boat was replaced with the aquarium's current vessel, the Coral Reef II.
In 1987, Shedd Aquarium was placed on the National Register of Historic Places.

John Shedd's grandson, John Shedd Reed, who had served as president of Atchison, Topeka and Santa Fe Railroad from 1967 to 1986, was president of the aquarium's board from 1984 until 1994, and was a life trustee until his death in 2008. Ted A. Beattie served as president and CEO of the aquarium from 1994 until his retirement in 2016.  Bridget C. Coughlin assumed duties as president and CEO of the company in the Spring of 2016.

Exhibits and presentations

There are several permanent exhibits at Shedd:  Waters of the World, Caribbean Reef, Amazon Rising, Wild Reef, and the Abbott Oceanarium.

Waters of the World
The oldest galleries in the aquarium feature exhibits on oceans, rivers, islands and lakes, and Chicago's own local waters. Species on exhibit include American bullfrog, a giant Pacific octopus, American alligator, lake sturgeon, starfish, lined seahorses, and alligator snapping turtle.

Caribbean Reef
The Caribbean Reef exhibit was built in 1971, on the site of the aquarium's very first exhibit, the Tropical Pool. A feature of this exhibit is a diver that interacts with the animals while talking with the people. A part of the exhibit is a  circular tank that allows for maximum walk-around viewing. It was one of the first habitats to display schooling fish. It is also home to the rescued green sea turtle, Nickel, as well as Atlantic tarpons, cownose rays, redband parrotfish, Bonnethead sharks, a Green moray eel, and many more species. The exhibit is near the center of the first floor. It is adjacent to Amazon Rising, Waters of the World, and Wild Reef.

Amazon Rising
The Amazon Rising exhibit is a  walkthrough flooded forest recreation of the Amazon River and the surrounding jungle. Species from this area on exhibit include a green anaconda, red-bellied piranhas, electric eels, freshwater stingrays, dwarf caimans, caiman lizards, wattled jacanas, yellow-spotted river turtles, red-footed tortoises, yellow-footed tortoises, mata matas, Arapaimas, different species of South American birds, fish, and frogs, and many more.

Wild Reef

In 2003, Shedd opened Wild Reef, a permanent exhibit located two levels below the main building. The Wild Reef exhibit also features a saltwater tank display area where coral is propagated and grown for conservation purposes.

Polar Play Zone
The exhibit is an interactive play area for children and contains an underwater viewing area of the beluga whales, Pacific white-sided dolphins and Sea otters. The exhibit also includes Southern rockhopper penguins and Magellanic penguins, as well as 5 circular tanks for moon jellyfish and starfishes that are by an interactive submarine model. There is also a starfish touch pool.

Stingray Touch
Opened on May 17, 2013, this exhibit allows guests to touch cownose rays as they swim around their  outdoor exhibit. Located on the aquarium's South Terrace, this exhibit is open seasonally from May through October (weather permitting).

Oceanarium

In 1991, Shedd Aquarium opened the Oceanarium (known since 2010 as the Abbott Oceanarium), a large addition to the aquarium that features marine mammals, including Pacific white-sided dolphins, beluga whales, sea otters and California sea lions, on the right side of the stairway that's next to the sea lions is an open estuary tank for several cuttlefish and by the sea otter exhibit, is a large natural looking touch tank for tide pool creatures like crabs, sea cucumbers and sea anemones. The lower level of the Oceanarium allows underwater viewing of the beluga whales and the dolphins. It holds  in total; the largest single tank is the  "Whale Harbour". The Oceanarium is the largest indoor marine mammal facility in the world.  Several of the sea otters that lived in the aquarium in the past were rescued from the Exxon Valdez oil spill in 1989. In the fall of 2008, Shedd's Oceanarium was closed for preventive sealing as well as administrative upgrades. The animals in the exhibit area were temporarily moved to other zoos and aquariums until the exhibit reopened in May 2009.

Land & Water
The Land & Water aquatic presentation (formerly One World), replaced Fantasea in 2013. The show is presented at a 1,000 seat amphitheater in the Oceanarium and features Pacific white-sided dolphins, beluga whales, penguins, and California sea lions. A holiday version is sometimes shown in November and December.

4D Theater
The 4D Theater opened in 2009 as part of the renovation of the Abbott Oceanarium. The 4D experience includes a 3D film with interactive seats, high-tech audio and interactive elements like scents and bubbles. Films shown have included Blue Planet, Splash and Bubbles, Sea Monsters, SpongeBob SquarePants 4-D, Ice Age: Dawn of the Dinosaurs, Rudolph The Red-Nosed Reindeer (seasonal), and The Polar Express (seasonal).

Current special exhibits

Underwater Beauty 
This exhibit opened on May 25, 2018, and focuses on the visual beauty of sea life, with sections called "Color", "Patterns", and "Rhythms."  The exhibit features 100 different species of fish and invertebrate, displayed to accent their visual qualities, including the  ribbon eel, lagoon jelly, flower hat jelly, peacock mantis shrimp, Weedy seadragon and longnose hawkfish.

Previous special exhibits

Jellies 
The "jellies" exhibit opened in April 2011, focusing on jellyfish, and the misconceptions surrounding them. It featured at least 10 species of jellyfish, including moon jellyfish, egg-yolk jellyfish, purple-striped jelly, Atlantic sea nettle, jelly blubber and upside-down jellyfish. The exhibit closed in 2015.

Amphibians 
The amphibian exhibit opened on May 15, 2015, and ran through January 1, 2018.  It featured 40 different species of amphibians, including the gray tree frog, poison dart frog, fire-bellied toad, emperor newt, axolotl, tiger salamander, spring peeper, Japanese giant salamander, cane toad, and the marbled salamander.

Fantasea 
Fantasea was a multiple-aquatic animal show at Shedd Aquarium, running from October 16, 2009, through 2010. The show featured beluga whales, penguins and Pacific white-sided dolphins.

Animals on exhibit, past and present

Australian Lungfish
Walter Chute, the aquarium's director from 1928 to 1964, wanted rare fish to attract the 10 million tourists expected to visit Chicago for the exposition in 1933. Granddad, an Australian lungfish, arrived at the Shedd in 1933, along with his mate, from Sydney during the Century of Progress world exposition. During the expo's run, they attracted about 4.5 million visitors.

At Granddad's death in 2017, he was claimed by the aquarium to be the oldest fish in any aquarium in the world. His normal behavior was to lay like a sunken log on the bottom of his habitat.

Beluga whales
Shedd Aquarium related living Belugas as of November 15, 2022: Naya (F), Beethoven (M), Kayavak (F), Bella (F), Aurek (M), Kimalu (F), Annik (M) and Atlas (M).

Mauyak, Qannik, Miki, Kimalu, Annik:  In 2000, Mauyak gave birth to Qannik, who was sent to Point Defiance Zoo in Tacoma where he died in 2009. On August 16, 2007, Mauyak gave birth yet again to a male calf named Miki, the Inuit word for ″small″ bringing the total number of successful beluga calf births at the aquarium to four since 1999. Miki has been moved to the Mystic Aquarium in 2016. On August 27, 2012, Mauyak gave birth to a female calf, Kimalu. On July 3, 2019, Mauyak gave birth to a male calf, Annik, bringing the total number of belugas at Shedd to eight. Mauyak died on Saturday, November 12 2022.  

Immiayuk, Kayavak: Kayavak is one of the most famous residents of the Oceanarium. The whale became an orphan at only five months old after her mother, Immiayuk, died. Trainers fed Kayavak fish, cared for her day and night, taught her how to "be a whale", and she thrived to be the healthy adult she is today.

Puiji, Bella, and Nunavik: In 2006, the beluga whale Puiji gave birth to a female calf, later named Bella. On December 14, 2009, she gave birth to a 162-pound, five-foot, four-inch male calf. Although it was a difficult birth, the calf survived and debuted to the public on Sunday, January 24, 2010. He has since been named "Nunavik" meaning "friendly, beautiful, and wild". Nunavik currently lives at the Georgia Aquarium as of 2016. Puiji died on Wednesday, October 26, 2011, following a seizure after having been undergoing treatment for an undisclosed medical condition over the course of several months.

Naluark: Naluark was transferred to Mystic Aquarium & Institute for Exploration in Mystic, Connecticut, in October 2011. He has since been moved to SeaWorld Orlando in 2016.

Naya: Another female beluga, named Naya, gave birth on December 20 to a 162-pound, five-foot two-inch male calf, though the calf died two days later from complications during birth.

Alaskan sea otters

Yaku (son of Kenai) was euthanized on February 26, 2022, due to failing health brought on by a tumor in his chest.

Kenai (Exxon Valdez oil spill survivor) was euthanized on October 9, 2012, due to failing health brought on by advancing years.

Kachemak (oldest sea otter in a North American Aquarium/Zoo) was euthanized on August 24, 2013, due to failing health related to age.

Southern sea otters

Luna (F), Cooper (M), Watson (M). Ellie (F)

Pacific white-sided dolphins

The aquarium has five white sided dolphins: Kri (F), Katrl (F), Munchkin (F), Makoa (M) and Harmony (F).

Sagu and Makoa were conceived by Li'i at the Miami Seaquarium when Piquet was on a breeding loan there. Piquet gave birth to Sagu on Memorial Day weekend in 2012. Piquet gave birth to her second calf, Makoa on June 1, 2015. On April 18, 2016, Katrl gave birth to a male calf sired by Li'i. The calf was placed on display on June 18, 2016, and was named Kukdlaa meaning "Bubbles" in the Tlingit language. Piquet was moved to Miami SeaQuarium in early 2018 for a breeding loan and Ipo was transferred to Shedd to take her place.

Green sea turtle

Nickel

Nickel is a female green sea turtle who resides at the Caribbean Reef exhibit located in directly in front of the main lobby. Nickel was rescued on Florida's Gulf Coast area in 1998, where she was struck by the propellers of a motorboat. This accident damaged her shell and paralyzed her from the waist down causing her to have buoyancy problems. Researchers thought that she could no longer live in the wild so she was brought to Shedd in the spring of 2003. Upon her arrival, she went through several medical examinations, including an x-ray. The x-ray revealed a 1975 nickel lodged in her throat which is where she received the name, Nickel. Nickel is one of the many rescued animals that reside in the Shedd. She serves as an example to many people of the effects human activities can have on wildlife.

North American river otter

Rio

Euthanized on October 29, 2013, due to age related health issues, Rio was 21 and lived well past the median life expectancy of a North American river otter.

Grouper  
Bubba

Bubba, a male Queensland grouper who was believed to be the first fish to undergo chemotherapy. He was introduced to the aquarium in 1987 and died in 2006.

Tarpon 
Deadeye

Deadeye, a female Atlantic tarpon, was the oldest fish to reside at the Caribbean Reef in the aquarium. She was first introduced to the aquarium in 1935 and died in 1998.

American alligators
In 2016, the Shedd Aquarium introduced for the first time American alligators (Alligator mississippiensis) to its permanent exhibit spaces. Eight juvenile alligators were added to the Islands and Lakes galleries.

Architecture

Shedd Aquarium is also notable for its architecture. The basic design, by architectural firm Graham, Anderson, Probst & White, is taken from classical Greek architecture, more specifically Beaux Arts, to match the other structures of the Museum Campus. The central aquarium building is octagonal, fronted by Doric columns and a formal staircase and topped by a dome. Aquatic motifs are worked in at every opportunity; tortoise shells, dolphins, octopuses, waves, and even the Trident of Poseidon can be found all over the aquarium's exterior and interior. Improving upon its predecessor inland aquarium, the Belle Isle Aquarium in Detroit, extensive use was made of designs by Mary Chase Perry Stratton, incorporating her custom-made Pewabic Pottery tile. The Oceanarium is done in a more modern style representing the Pacific Northwest, but one that blends with the older part of the building. "Whale Harbor", the Oceanarium's  main tank, is backed by a wall of windows that look out onto Lake Michigan.

Conservation and research
The Daniel P. Haerther Center for Conservation and Research helps to provide on-site research at the aquarium. They study topics such as animal health and behavior, nutrition, animal training, reproduction and genetics.

The International Union for Conservation of Nature (IUCN) designated the Shedd Aquarium as its Center for Species Survival:Freshwater, to study and promote the conservation and restoration of global freshwater systems, and strategies for freshwater species survival.

The aquarium also partners with conservation efforts in the Caribbean and Southeast Asia. The Bahamian rock iguana is one of the most endangered lizards in the world. Since 1994, the Shedd Aquarium has been studying and providing conservation plans for this iguana. The Shedd Aquarium is now recognized as the lead authority on this iguana. In Southeast Asia, the Shedd partners with Project Seahorse to monitor and map out the seahorse populations in Southeast Asia.

Since 1991, the Shedd Aquarium has been involved with research focused on beluga whales. They focus on the animal handling procedures to ensure the animals’ welfare. The aquarium does most of their beluga whale research in Bristol Bay in southwest Alaska.

See also
 List of museums and cultural institutions in Chicago
 Chicago architecture
 Culture of Chicago
 Art Institute of Chicago
 Lincoln Park Zoo
 Brookfield Zoo
 Museum of Science and Industry (Chicago)
 List of National Historic Landmarks in Illinois

Gallery

Notes

References
 Oceanarium Press Kit

External links
 
 

Aquaria in Illinois
Oceanaria in the United States
National Historic Landmarks in Chicago
Buildings and structures on the National Register of Historic Places in Chicago
Tourist attractions in Chicago
Museum Campus
1930 establishments in Illinois